Tikal Temple II (or the Temple of the Masks, alternatively labelled by archaeologists as Tikal Structure 5D-2) is a Mesoamerican pyramid at the Maya archaeological site of Tikal in the Petén Department of northern Guatemala. The temple was built in the Late Classic Period in a style reminiscent of the Early Classic. Temple II is located on the west side of the Great Plaza, opposite Temple I. Temple II was built by the king Jasaw Chan K'awiil I in honour of his wife, Lady Kalajuun Une' Mo'. Temple II had a single wooden sculpted lintel that bears the portrait of a royal woman who may have been the wife of Jasaw Chan K'awiil I, who was entombed beneath Temple I. Lady Kalajuun Une' Mo', whose name means "Twelve Macaw Tails", was also important for being the mother of Jasaw Chan K'awill I's heir. In fact her son Yik'in Chan K'awiil oversaw the completion of Temple II when he became king.

Temple II was visited by Modesto Méndez, the governor of Petén, in 1848 on the first expedition to the ruins. Preliminary excavations of Temple II started in 1958. On 21 December 2012, more than 7,000 tourists visited Tikal to celebrate the 2012 phenomenon and the supposed end of the world. Many of these tourists climbed the stairs of the pyramid, causing reported damages.

The structure
The pyramid is a squat, massive structure dating to the 8th century AD. Its original height would have been closer to  including its roof comb. Excavations inside Temple II failed to discover Lady Kalajuun Une' Mo's tomb. Ancient graffiti within the temple shrine depicts a captive upon a platform and bound between two poles being sacrificed with an arrow or a spear. Further ancient graffiti includes images of temples. Some of this graffiti dates to the Classic Period, although other examples appear to date to the Early Postclassic. The interior walls have also been defaced with modern graffiti. Evidence of ritual use in the Postclassic Period was found within the temple shrine, including burials and offerings.

The pyramid rises in three stepped levels; upon the uppermost level is a wide platform supporting the summit shrine. Two badly eroded giant masks adorn the upper platform, flanking the stairway to the shrine. These grotesque masks decorating the pyramid's facade give Temple II its alternative name of the Temple of the Masks. A large block of masonry was built into the stairway immediately outside the entrance to the shrine. this block may have served as an observation platform allowing the officiating priests to see the crowd in the plaza below and in turn be seen by the people there.

The roof comb of the temple is highly ornate and bears the sculpture of a face with circular earspools. Various sealed chambers exist within the roof comb.

The temple shrine upon the summit of the pyramid contains three chambers, the doorways of which were spanned by lintels. Only the lintel over the middle doorway was carved. The lintel consisted of five wooden beams, one of which is now in the American Museum of Natural History in New York. When excavated the lintels had fallen from their original positions and have been restored.

At the base of the main access stairway stands Stela P-83, which was plain, without sculpted decoration or hieroglyphic texts. It is associated with its respective altar.

See also

El Castillo, Chichen Itza
Pyramid of the Magician at Uxmal
Temple of the Inscriptions at Palenque
Tikal Temple III
Tikal Temple IV
Tikal Temple V
List of tallest structures built before the 20th century

Notes

References

 
 
 
 
 
 
 
 
 
 

Tikal
Maya architecture
Pyramids in Guatemala
Buildings and structures completed in the 8th century
8th century in Guatemala
8th-century establishments in the Maya civilization